Jeopardy is a British–Australian children's science fiction drama programme created by Tim O'Mara. It ran for three series, from 26 April 2002 to 11 May 2004, on BBC One. In total 40 episodes of Jeopardy have aired.

Series overview

Episodes

Series 1 (2002)

Series 2 (2003)

Series 3 (2004)

External links 
 Jeopardy on BBC
 

Lists of Australian children's television series episodes
Lists of Australian drama television series episodes
Lists of British children's television series episodes
Lists of British science fiction television series episodes